Ray Pelfrey (January 11, 1928 — April 1, 2017) was a professional American football wide receiver who played for three seasons for the Green Bay Packers, Chicago Cardinals, Dallas Texans, and New York Giants.

References

1928 births
2017 deaths
People from Sardinia, Ohio
Players of American football from Ohio
American football wide receivers
Auburn Tigers football players
Eastern Kentucky Colonels football players
Green Bay Packers players
Chicago Cardinals players
Dallas Texans (NFL) players
New York Giants players